Bulimulus limnoides is a species of  tropical air-breathing land snail, a pulmonate gastropod mollusk in the subfamily Bulimulinae.

Distribution 
Distribution of Bulimulus limnoides include:

 Guadeloupe
 Dominica - Breure (1974), after having compared the type material of Bulimulus limnoides in the Muséum national d'histoire naturelle, Paris, France, placed the Dominican taxon in the synonymy of Férussac’s species. Apart from the locality given by George French Angas (1884), the first precise records of this species from the island have been published in 2009.
 Martinique
 ? Saint Vincent

Ecology 
Living specimens were found on small shrubs in Dominica.

References
This article incorporates CC-BY-3.0 text from the reference 

Bulimulus
Gastropods described in 1832